Andrea Jane Duran (born April 12, 1984) is an American, former collegiate All-American, medal-winning Olympian, professional four-time All-Star softball player. She played college softball at the University of California, Los Angeles in the Pac-12 Conference, where she was named to the all-conference team twice, and Pac-12 Player of the Year in 2006. She also won two national championships in 2003 and 2004, and was named to the All-Tournament team in 2006. She won a silver medal at the 2008 Summer Olympics. On the Olympic team she played third base and outfield.  Duran was undrafted but later played professionally in the National Pro Fastpitch, being named the 2014 Player of the Year and winning three Cowles Cup championships with the USSSA Pride.

Career
Her international competition debut was with the United States women's national softball team in 2006 where they went on to win a gold medal at the 2006 ISF World Championship. 

In 2010 she returned to UCLA to assume a position as director of operations with the coaching staff for the UCLA Softball Team.

For her career in the NPF she currently ranks top-10 in career RBIs (133) for the league.

Statistics

UCLA Bruins

Team USA Olympic Games

References

External links 
 Website
 
 

1984 births
Living people
Medalists at the 2008 Summer Olympics
Olympic silver medalists for the United States in softball
Olympic softball players of the United States
People from Selma, California
Softball players at the 2007 Pan American Games
Softball players at the 2008 Summer Olympics
Softball players from California
UCLA Bruins softball players
USSSA Pride players
Pan American Games competitors for the United States